Amazon Wind Farm Texas is a 253 megawatt wind farm in Scurry County, Texas. The farm opened in late 2017, and consists of 110 turbines, which together generate approximately 1,000 gigawatt-hours of electricity annually, enough to power approximately 90,000 US homes.

In a statement, Amazon revealed that it has entered into an agreement to purchase 90 percent of the facility's output. The facility was built by Lincoln Clean Energy, now part of Ørsted, which also owns and operates the wind farm. This facility is one example of Amazon's large and increasing long-term investment in renewable energy.

The wind farm, which is a few miles from the ghost town of Dermott, is called Dermott Wind in Energy Information Administration and Electric Reliability Council of Texas sources.

See also

Wind power in Texas
Wind power in the United States

References

External links
U.S. Energy Information Administration data

Wind farms in Texas
Scurry County, Texas
Buildings and structures in Scurry County, Texas